is a town located in Saitama Prefecture, Japan. , the town had an estimated population of 33,823 in 15,234 households and a population density of 2100 persons per km².

Geography
Miyashiro is located in central-west Saitama Prefecture.

Surrounding municipalities
Saitama Prefecture
 Kasukabe
 Shiraoka
 Kuki
 Sugito

Climate
Miyashiro has a humid subtropical climate (Köppen Cfa) characterized by warm summers and cool winters with light to no snowfall.  The average annual temperature in Miyashiro is 14.5 °C. The average annual rainfall is 1408 mm with September as the wettest month. The temperatures are highest on average in August, at around 26.3 °C, and lowest in January, at around 2.7 °C.

Demographics
Per Japanese census data, the population of Miyashiro has recently plateaued after a long period of growth.

History
The villages of Monma and Suka were created within Minamisaitama District, Saitama with the establishment of the modern municipalities system on April 1, 1889. The two villages were merged on July 20, 1955 to form the town of Miyashiro. Ina was elevated to town status on November 1, 1970. The origin of the town's name comes from the shrines of the largest villages. "Miya" was taken from Himemiya shrine (姫宮神社) in Himemiya village and "shiro" from Konoshiro shrine (身代神社) in Suka village.

Government
Miyashiro has a mayor-council form of government with a directly elected mayor and a unicameral town council of 14 members. Miyashiro, together with the city of Shiraoka, contributes one member to the Saitama Prefectural Assembly. In terms of national politics, the town is part of Saitama 11th district of the lower house of the Diet of Japan.

Economy
The economy of Miyashiro is primarily agricultural.

Education
Nippon Institute of Technology
Miyashiro has four public elementary schools and three public middle schools operated by the city government, and one public high school operated by the Saitama Prefectural Board of Education. The prefecture also operates one special education school for the handicapped.

Transportation

Railway
 Tōbu Railway - Tōbu Isesaki Line/Tōbu Skytree Line
 -  - 
 Tōbu Railway - Tōbu Nikkō Line

Highway
Miyashiro is not located on any national highway or expressway.

Local attractions
 , a zoological-amusement park complex which is owned by the Tōbu Group.

Noted people from Miyashiro
Mariko Kouda, voice actress
Grape-Kun (グレープ君 / Gurēpu-kun), Humboldt penguin (Spheniscus humboldti)

References

External links

Official Website 

Towns in Saitama Prefecture
Miyashiro, Saitama